John Davis,  (July 31, 1916 – March 27, 1991) was a Canadian politician from British Columbia who was elected both federally and provincially.

Early life and education
Born in Kamloops General Hospital, in Kamloops, British Columbia, Davis grew up in Tranquille Valley on a  homestead where he attended school in a one-room log cabin. The Davis family moved into Kamloops so that Davis could attend Grade 8 at Kamloops High School; he was elected student council president, as was his sister Ethel Davis Moore. Jack won provincial scholarships in junior and senior matriculation, the latter with the highest marks in B.C. Jack attended the University of British Columbia, where he was president of the Engineers and the Men's Undergraduate Society, and a member of U.B.C. Thunderbird Basketball team, which won the Canadian Men's Senior Championship. He graduated with a Bachelor of Applied Science (chemical engineering) and was chosen a Rhodes Scholar from British Columbia in 1939.

His attendance at St John's College, Oxford University, was interrupted by the Second World War. Davis was the only engineer on a Canadian research team at a McGill University developing a new process for manufacturing RDX. Writing up the RDX process gave Jack his PhD in Science in 1942.

Political career
In 1962, Davis was elected to the Canadian House of Commons representing the riding of Coast—Capilano, a riding which stretched from Deep Cove in the District of North Vancouver to Powell River and Pemberton. A member of the then-minority Liberal Party of Canada, he was re-elected in the following year in the train of  the national Liberal victory and was appointed as the Parliamentary Secretary to Prime Minister Lester B. Pearson. Davis was re-elected in the Canadian federal elections of 1965 and 1968 (now in the riding of Capilano (electoral district) and 1972. A cabinet minister in the government of Pierre Elliott Trudeau, he was Minister without Portfolio, Minister of Fisheries, Minister of Fisheries and Forestry, and the first Minister of the Environment in the English-speaking world. He was defeated in the Canadian federal election of 1974.

In the British Columbia provincial election of 1975, he was elected to the Legislative Assembly of British Columbia as a member of the British Columbia Social Credit Party representing the district of North Vancouver-Seymour. He was sworn in as the Minister of Transport and Communication in the new Bill Bennett government. He resigned in 1978 at the demand of the Premier, Bill Bennett. He was fined $1,000 on September 18, 1978 after being convicted of fraud over his practice of converting Government-paid first class airline tickets to economy class and keeping the change.

He was re-elected in the 1979 British Columbia general election, 1983 British Columbia general election, 1986 British Columbia general election. Davis was also a cabinet minister in the government of Bill Vander Zalm and was Minister of Energy, Mines and Petroleum Resources when he died in office of cancer in 1991.

An energy audit prepared for Alternative Energy Policy Branch of the Ministry of Energy and Mines in 2005 found that the Jack Davis Building at 1810 Blanshard Street in Victoria was currently operating at a high level of energy efficiency. The initial design of the building, which won the building acclaim upon completion in 1992, is still reaping the benefits of energy efficient construction via low energy expenditures.

Legacy
There are two scholarships to UBC awarded in memory of Davis. The Jack Davis Scholarship in Energy Studies is a $2,700 scholarship that has been endowed by Westcoast Energy Inc. in memory of the Honourable Jack Davis. The award is made to a graduate student in energy studies at the University of British Columbia. The second Jack Davis scholarship is awarded annually to an outstanding all-round North Shore secondary school graduate to assist in his or her entering the University of British Columbia.

Victoria Office building named after Jack Davis is located at 1810 Blanshard Street
Victoria, BC, Canada.

References

External links

Jack Davis Scholarship in Energy Studies grad.ubc.ca
1810 Blanshard Street, Victoria, BC, Canada
Photos of Jack Davis building

1916 births
1991 deaths
Alumni of St John's College, Oxford
British Columbia Social Credit Party MLAs
Canadian chemical engineers
Canadian Rhodes Scholars
Liberal Party of Canada MPs
McGill University Faculty of Science alumni
Members of the 20th Canadian Ministry
Members of the Executive Council of British Columbia
Members of the House of Commons of Canada from British Columbia
Members of the King's Privy Council for Canada
Members of the United Church of Canada
People from Kamloops